The Bard of Bath is the winner of an annual competition to find Bath's best poet, singer or storyteller. The Bard uses the title to develop artistic projects in the area and leads evening bardic walks around the city.

The title resurrects an Iron-Age Celtic Druid tradition where Druids were the law-makers, judges and ceremonial leaders, Ovates were mediums, healers and prophets and Bards were poets, musicians and history-keepers. All of them held high status and a place in mystical/religious circles.

Each Chaired Bard becomes a member of the Gorsedd and retains their title (specified by year). The current Bard of Bath, as of February 2020, is Tick Rowley.

Winners
 Tim Sebastian, 1996–97
 Richard Carder, 1997-8
 Kevan Manwaring, 1998-9
 Olivia Hicks, 1999–2000
 Julian Landau, 2000-1
 Brendan Georgeson, 2001-2
 Mark Lindsey Earley, 2002-3
 Helen Moore, 2003-4
 Jordan Ashley Hill 2004-5
 Mo the People's Nun, 2005-6
 Ash Mandrake, 2006–2007
 Thommie Gillow, 2007–2008
 Master Duncan, 2008–2009
 Jack Dean, 2009–2010
 Jennifer Walter 2010-2012 (re-elected) 
 2012-2013 No Chair awarded 
 Mark Westmore 2013-2014
 Sheila Broun 2014-2015 
 Conor Whelan, 2019–20
 Tick Rowley, 2020-2021

References

External links 
 

British poetry awards
History of Bath, Somerset
Neo-druidism
Culture in Somerset